The 2010 The All-Japan Rugby Football Championship (日本ラグビーフットボール選手権大会 Nihon Ragubi- Futtobo-ru Senshuken Taikai) starts on Feb 6th and finishes with the final on Feb 27th.

Qualifying Teams 

 Top League Playoff Finalists - Toshiba Brave Lupus, Sanyo Wild Knights
 Top League Playoff Teams - Suntory Sungoliath, Toyota Verblitz
 Top League Wild Card Playoff - NEC Green Rockets, Kobelco Steelers
 All Japan University Rugby Championship - Teikyo University, Tokai University
 Japan Rugby Club Champion - Rokko Rugby RFC
 Top League Challenger Series - NTT Communications Shining Arcs

Knockout stages

First round 

Although Suntory Sungoliath and NEC Green Rockets drew. NEC Green Rockets advanced to the next round.

Quarter-final

Semi-final 

Toshiba and Sanyo Wild Knights bypass the first two rounds into the semi-finals this year.

Final

External links 

  Official Scores (Japanese)
  Japan Rugby Football Union Website (Japanese and English)
  - Toshiba Brave Lupus Rugby Website (Japanese)
  - Sanyo Wild Knights Rugby Homepage (English)
  - Suntory Sungoliath Rugby Homepage (Japanese)
  - Toyota Verblitz Rugby Homepage (Japanese)
  - NEC Green Rockets Rugby Homepage (Japanese)
  - Kobe Steel Kobelco Steelers Rugby Homepage (Japanese)
  - Teikyo University Rugby Homepage (Japanese)
  - Tokai University Rugby Homepage (Japanese)
  - Rokko Rugby Homepage (Japanese)
  - NTT Shining Arcs Rugby Homepage (Japanese)

All-Japan Rugby Football Championship
2009–10 in Japanese rugby union
Japan All rugby